Thomas Byng (fl. 1614), was an English politician.

He was a Member (MP) of the Parliament of England for Castle Rising in 1614.

References

Year of birth missing
Year of death missing
English MPs 1614